Daram in Iran may refer to:
 Daram, Mazandaran (درام - Darām)
 Daram, Zanjan (درم - Daram)